Cricket is the most popular dry season sport in Bangladesh. It is played nationwide through the months of November to May. Governance of the sport is the responsibility of the Bangladesh Cricket Board (BCB), established in 1972.

Bangladesh is a full member of the International Cricket Council (ICC) and the Asian Cricket Council. Full ICC membership was achieved in 2000 and the Bangladesh men's team played its inaugural Test match that year. The national team is known as the "Tigers" – after the Royal Bengal Tiger. The women's national team has played top-level international cricket since 2014.

Bangladesh has three nationwide domestic competitions. The most lucrative is the Bangladesh Premier League (BPL), a Twenty20 tournament played in January and February which attracts international players from other countries. There are two first-class championships: the National Cricket League, played by teams representing the country's administrative divisions; and the Bangladesh Cricket League, played by zonal teams.

History

Cricket was introduced to Bengal by the British in the eighteenth century. Following Partition and the creation of East Pakistan, both first-class and Test cricket were played there during the 1950s and 1960s. The sport continued to be popular after independence, especially in Dhaka, but the country lost first-class status and had to establish itself in international competition as an Associate Member of the International Cricket Council (ICC).

Progress was made in the 1990s. The Bangladesh men's team won the 1997 ICC Trophy and made a good showing at the 1999 Cricket World Cup. In the 1999–2000 season, the Bangladesh Cricket Board (BCB) was formally established and, in preparation for full membership of the ICC, created the National Cricket League (NCL). In November 2000, Bangladesh played their inaugural Test match against India at the Bangabandhu National Stadium in Dhaka. The NCL was granted first-class status ahead of the 2000–01 season.

International cricket

Test cricket

The Bangladesh national cricket team, known as "The Tigers", is the national cricket team of Bangladesh. Bangladesh became a full member of the International Cricket Council (ICC) in 2000 and played their first Test match that year against India in Dhaka, becoming the tenth Test cricket playing nation. They also take part in officially sanctioned ACC tournaments including the Asian Test Championship.

One Day Internationals

placeholder – to be completed

Twenty20 Internationals

placeholder – to be completed

Women's international cricket

Bangladesh has an active women's team which gained One Day International status after finishing 5th at the 2011 Women's Cricket World Cup Qualifier. The women's team also claimed the silver medal at the 2010 Asian Games cricket tournament and won the 2018 Women's Asia Cup.

Domestic cricket

First-class cricket

National Cricket League

Soon after the establishment of the BCB, a cricket league commenced in Dhaka and Chittagong at district (regional) level. It became a national tournament in 1974–75. Other tournaments were organised at school, college, youth and university levels.

The National Cricket League was founded in the 1999–2000 season ahead of Bangladesh being promoted to full membership of the ICC. It became a first-class competition in 2000–01. It involves eight teams, seven representing administrative divisions and one from the Dhaka Metropolis. There are eight administrative divisions but Mymensingh is not represented. Since the 2015–16 season, the league has been split into two tiers with promotion and relegation. In the 2022–23 tournament, won by Rangpur Division, the structure was as follows:

A team sponsored by Biman Bangladesh Airlines played in the 2000–01 season and won the NCL title. That was their only appearance. Since then, the most successful teams (see table above) have been Khulna, Rajshahi and Dhaka Division.

Bangladesh Cricket League

A second first-class tournament, the Bangladesh Cricket League, was launched in 2012. This has a similar concept to India's Duleep Trophy as the contestants are zonal teams: Central, South, East and North Zones. The most successful team has been South Zone with five league titles between 2014 and 2020.

Performances
There have been numerous instances of batters scoring 1,000 first-class runs in a Bangladeshi season. The highest aggregate to date is 1,249 by Tushar Imran of Khulna in the 2016–17 season. His average was 89.21 runs per completed innings. Many bowlers have taken 50 wickets in a season and the highest aggregate to date is 68 by Abdur Razzak, also of Khulna, in the 2017–18 season. Razzak has been the country's leading wicket-taker in four seasons between 2014–15 and 2019–20.

Twenty20 cricket

In 2010, the NCL T20 was launched. This was a Twenty20 tournament which was dropped after its first and only season and was replaced by the Bangladesh Premier League (BPL) in 2012. The BPL is a Twenty20 league with six franchises based on the concept of the Indian Premier League and has attracted many international players. Rajshahi Rangers won the NCL T20. Comilla Victorians have been the most successful BPL team to date with three titles.

One-day cricket

The National Cricket League One-Day tournament began in 2000–01 as Bangladesh's principal domestic limited overs cricket competition. It was terminated in 2011 and has since been superseded by the Dhaka Premier Division Cricket League, which gained List A status in 2013. Rajshahi Division were the most successful team in the NCL One-Day with three titles. In the Dhaka competition, Abahani Limited have won the title three times to 2022.

Women's cricket
placeholder – to be completed

Club Cricket
placeholder – to be completed

International grounds

Updated: 7 February 2021

Listed in order of match first used for international match

In Bangladeshi culture
Cricket holds a significant position in the culture of Bangladesh. Matches are played before large audiences both at grounds and on TV and other media.

References

External links
 Bangla Cricket: The official cricket site for Bangladesh cricket fans. Come here for latest information on Bangladesh cricket, live discussion, breaking news and much more.
 Cricinfo-Bangladesh: Home of cricket on the internet. Cricinfo offers the most comprehensive live coverage of international and domestic cricket in Bangladesh as well as in other cricket playing nations.
 Tiger Cricket: The official web site of Bangladesh Cricket Control Board.
 Bangladesh Cricket Board: History of Bangladesh cricket
 CricBD: Cricket, Bangladesh and Beyond. Bangladesh cricket news, scorecards, player profiles, statistics, and discussion forums.
 A brief history of Bangladesh domestic cricket
 CricketArchive re tournaments in Bangladesh

 
Sports in Bangladesh